Daron Alcorn (born May 12, 1971) is a former American football placekicker who played eight seasons in the Arena Football League with the Portland Forest Dragons/Oklahoma Wranglers, San Jose SaberCats and Las Vegas Gladiators. He was drafted by the Tampa Bay Buccaneers with the last selection in the 1993 NFL Draft, making him Mr. Irrelevant. He played college football at the University of Akron and attended Mountain View High School in Vancouver, Washington. Alcorn was also a member of the Frankfurt Galaxy of the World League of American Football.

College career
Alcorn played for the Akron Zips from 1989 to 1992. He played punter as well as placekicker. He was named first-team All-Mid-American Conference in 1993.

Professional career

Tampa Bay Buccaneers
Alcorn was selected by the Tampa Bay Buccaneers with the final pick in the 1993 NFL Draft, earning the title of Mr. Irrelevant. He was released by the Buccaneers on August 16, 1993.

Frankfurt Galaxy
Alcorn played for the Frankfurt Galaxy during the 1995 season and the team won the World Bowl '95.

Portland Forest Dragons/Oklahoma Wranglers
Alcorn played for the Portland Forest Dragons/Oklahoma Wranglers from 1997 to 2000. He earned Second Team All-Arena honors in 1997 and 1999. The Forest Dragons moved to Oklahoma in 2000.

San Jose SaberCats
Alcorn signed with the San Jose SaberCats on July 13, 2001. The SaberCats won ArenaBowl XVI against the Arizona Rattlers on August 18, 2002. He was released by the SaberCats on December 22, 2003.

Las Vegas Gladiators
Alcorn was signed by the Las Vegas Gladiators on January 24, 2004. He was released by the Gladiators on February 26, 2004.

References

External links
Just Sports Stats
College stats

Living people
1971 births
Players of American football from Washington (state)
American football placekickers
American football punters
Akron Zips football players
Frankfurt Galaxy players
Portland Forest Dragons players
Oklahoma Wranglers players
San Jose SaberCats players
Las Vegas Gladiators players
Sportspeople from Vancouver, Washington